Agares (also Agarat, Agaros, or Agarus) is a demon described in demonological grimoires.

Description
Agares is described in grimoires such as the Livre des Esperitz (as Agarat), the Pseudomonarchia Daemonum, the Lesser Key of Solomon, and the Dictionnaire Infernal as a duke "under the power of the east," an "old man, riding upon a crocodile, and carrying a hawk on his fist," who teaches languages, stops and retrieves runaway persons, causes earthquakes, and grants noble titles.

Legions and standing
Lemegeton Clavicula Salomonis and the Pseudomonarchia Daemonum both list him as the second spirit, and state that he commands 31 legions of demons, while the Livre des Esperitz (which describes him simply as an old man) gives him 36.  

The Book of the Office of Spirits places him (as Agaros) second under Oriens and describes him as an old man riding a cockatrice, without the hawk.  The Grimoire of Pope Honorius (which refers to him as Agarus) is more brief, omitting the crocodile and hawk, and omitting his functions beyond languages and titles.  The Grand Grimoire features him as a subordinate of Lucifuge Rofocale.  According to Thomas Rudd, Agares is opposed by the Shemhamphorasch angel Jelial.  Sloane MS 3824 mentions Agares throughout in invocations to summon spirits that guard treasure, and in the "Experiment of Agares," meant to draw him into a crystal.

Notes

References 

Goetic demons